The Engine House No. 4 in Tacoma, Washington, at 220-224 E. 26th St., was built in 1911.  It was listed on the National Register of Historic Places in 1984.

It is a two-story brick building with "classically inspired terra cotta details", and it has a salient four-story hose tower.  It was designed by architect Frederic Shaw.

It is no longer in service as a fire station.  In 2008 it was used by the City of Tacoma's traffic signal division.

References

Fire stations on the National Register of Historic Places in Washington (state)
National Register of Historic Places in Pierce County, Washington
Fire stations completed in 1911